Tomasz Strzembosz  (11 September 1930 – 16 October 2004) was a Polish historian and writer who specialized in the World War II history of Poland. He was a professor at the Polish Academy of Sciences Institute of Political Studies, in Warsaw; and, from 1991, at the John Paul II Catholic University of Lublin. Strzembosz was a resident of Warsaw, Poland.

Postwar career
After World War II, Tomasz Strzembosz was persecuted by the Polish People's Republic government's Urząd Bezpieczeństwa (Security Office). In the mid-1950s, Stalinist Poland he was prevented from obtaining a master's degree and was repeatedly laid off from work.

Strzembosz was one of the few Polish People's Republic historians who refused to write Soviet-inspired falsehoods about Poland's history. His main areas of research included the history of the World War II Polish Underground State, with special emphasis on German-occupied Warsaw; the Polish partisan movement in the Kresy macroregion between 1939 and 1941, following the Soviet invasion of Poland; and the 1944–46 anti-communist resistance in Poland.

In the 1980s, Strzembosz was an activist in the anti-communist Solidarity movement. In 1989–93, he was president of the Polish Scouting Association (photo).

Strzembosz authored a dozen books and over 100 scholarly papers. He also edited or reviewed over a dozen works by other authors. In 2002, he received  Poland's  Prize.

Family 
Tomasz Strzembosz was one of a set of triplets, with Roman-Catholic activist Teresa and law-professor-judge Adam Strzembosz, who served as chief justice of Poland's Supreme Court. Tomasz married Maria (Maryla) Dawidowska, sister of anti-Nazi underground scouting hero Maciej Aleksy Dawidowski.

Bibliography

Books
Tumult warszawski 1525 r., PWN, Warszawa 1959
Odbijanie i uwalnianie więźniów w Warszawie 1939-1944, PWN, Warsaw 1972
Ludność cywilna w powstaniu warszawskim 1944, et al. Vol. 1, PIW, Warsaw 1974 (Academy of Sciences Award)
Akcje zbrojne podziemnej Warszawy 1939-1945, PIW, Warsaw 1978, reprinted: PWN 1983
Oddziały szturmowe konspiracyjnej Warszawy 1939-1945, PWN, 1979, 
Szare Szeregi jako organizacja wychowawcza, IWZZ, Warsaw 1984
Refleksje o Polsce i podziemiu 1939-1945, Spotkania, Lublin 1986, reprinted 1990
Bohaterowie "Kamieni na szaniec" w świetle dokumentów, PWN, Warsaw 1994
Saga o "Łupaszce" ppłk. Jerzym Dąbrowskim 1889-1941, Rytm, Warsaw 1996
Rzeczpospolita podziemna (1939 - 1945), Krupski i Spółka, Warsaw 2000
W stronę zachodzącego słońca, RYTM, Warsaw 2003
Antysowiecka partyzantka i konspiracja nad Biebrzą X 1939 - VI 1941, 2004.

Notes

1930 births
2004 deaths
Writers from Warsaw
20th-century Polish historians
Polish male non-fiction writers
Polish Scouts and Guides
Solidarity (Polish trade union) activists
Academic staff of the John Paul II Catholic University of Lublin